In organisational psychology, the honeymoon-hangover effect describes the relationship between employee job change and job satisfaction. Low satisfaction typically precedes a voluntary job change, with an increase in job satisfaction immediately following a job change (the honeymoon effect), followed by a decline in job satisfaction (the hangover effect)

References

Industrial and organizational psychology